Nordvik is a former municipality in Nordland county, Norway. The  municipality existed from 1917 until its dissolution in 1962. The island municipality encompassed the central part of the island of Dønna as well as the smaller surrounding islands of Vandve, Slapøya, Havstein, and many others in what is now the southern part of Dønna Municipality.  The municipality had 2 churches: Nordvik Church in the north and Hæstad Church in the south.

History
The municipality of Nordvik was established on 1 July 1917 when the northern part of Herøy Municipality was divided into two with Nordvik in the north and Herøy in the south. Initially, Nordvik had a population of 1,530. During the 1960s, there were many municipal mergers across Norway due to the work of the Schei Committee. On 1 January 1962, the municipality of Nordvik (population: 1,293) was merged with the part of Herøy Municipality on the island of Dønna (population: 19), most of Dønnes Municipality (population: 1,348), and the part of Nesna Municipality on the island of Løkta (population: 80) to become the new Dønna Municipality.

Name
The municipality (originally the parish) is named after the old Nordviken farm.

Government
While it existed, this municipality was responsible for primary education (through 10th grade), outpatient health services, senior citizen services, unemployment, social services, zoning, economic development, and municipal roads. During its existence, this municipality was governed by a municipal council of elected representatives, which in turn elected a mayor.

Municipal council
The municipal council  of Nordvik was made up of representatives that were elected to four year terms.  The party breakdown of the final municipal council was as follows:

See also
List of former municipalities of Norway

References

Dønna
Former municipalities of Norway
1917 establishments in Norway
1962 disestablishments in Norway